The La Jolla Concours d'Elegance is a concours d'Elegance competition held annually in April on the La Jolla Cove beachfront in San Diego, California.

It is hosted by the La Jolla Historical Society.

History 
In 2004 the event started as the La Jolla Motor Car Classic that included hot rods and antiques all from the local community. The next year the committee expanded by partnering with known Southern California car enthusiasts to help expand it to the more prestigious concours audience. By 2005 the event was expanded to a full weekend, containing the La Jolla Motor Classic Car Tour that has many of the competition automobiles driving along the La Jolla coast, a black-tie cocktail party for competitors and attendees, and the finale car show on Sunday.

In 2009 the committee turned the event's ownership over to the La Jolla Historical Society.

In 2011 the event was officially renamed to the La Jolla Concours d'Elegance and debuted with over 125 automobiles.

In 2015 the competition was restructured with one overall Best of Show winner instead of a pre and post-war Best of Show.

The 2020 and 2021 events were cancelled due to the COVID-19 pandemic.

The 2022 the event featured several live air shows with vintage aircraft alongside the concours and was sponsored by LPL Financial and Pacific Sotheby's.

Best of Show winners

Other winners

References

External links 

 https://www.lajollaconcours.com

Concours d'Elegance
Annual events in California
La Jolla, San Diego
Auto shows in the United States
Recurring events established in 2013